The MP-57 is a submachine gun which was manufactured by Mauser after the Second World War for the then newly established Bundeswehr. It was chambered in the 9×19mm round and fed from a magazine inserted in the pistol grip.

References
 
 Mauser MP-57

Submachine guns of Germany
Machine pistols
9mm Parabellum submachine guns
Mauser firearms